I Miss You may refer to:

Albums
I Miss You (EP), by Girl's Day, 2014, also the title song
I Miss You (album), by Harold Melvin & The Blue Notes, 1972, also the title song

Songs
"I Miss You" (Aaron Hall song), 1994
"I Miss You" (Badfinger song), 1974
"I Miss You" (Basshunter song), 2008
"I Miss You" (Beverley Craven song), 1999
"I Miss You" (Beyoncé song), 2011
"I Miss You" (Björk song), 1995
"I Miss You" (Blink-182 song), 2004
"I Miss You" (Boyfriend song), 2017
"I Miss You" (Clean Bandit song), 2017
"I Miss You" (Darren Hayes song), 2002
"I Miss You" (DMX song), 2001
"I Miss You" (Haddaway song), 1993
"I Miss You" (Klymaxx song), 1985
"I Miss You" (Miley Cyrus song), 2007
"I Miss You" (N II U song), 1995
"I Miss You" (Sarah Engels song), 2011
"I Miss You" (Webbie song), 2008
"I Miss You (Toki o Koete)", by Misia, 2001
"I Miss You" / "The Future", by Cute, 2014
"I Miss You", by Adele from 25
"I Miss You", by Grey
"I Miss You", by Incubus from Make Yourself
"I Miss You", by Mamamoo from Melting
"I Miss You", by Kylie Minogue from Kylie
"I Miss You", by Randy Newman from Bad Love
"I Miss You", by Thundamentals
"I Miss You", by Yohanna from Butterflies and Elvis
"I Miss U", a 2020 song by Jax Jones and Au/Ra

Other uses
I Miss You (film), a 2019 Bolivian film

See also
"Honey (I Miss You)", a 1968 song by Bobby Goldsboro
I Miss You, I Miss You!, a 1992 novel by Peter Pohl and Kinna Gieth
"Miss You in a Heartbeat", a 1993 song by Def Leppard
"Stay (I Missed You)", a 1994 song by Lisa Loeb
"Missing" (Everything but the Girl song)
Miss (disambiguation)
Miss You (disambiguation)
Missing You (disambiguation)